Rob Lantz is a Canadian politician. He was the leader of the Progressive Conservative Party of Prince Edward Island for seven months in 2015, having been elected during the party's leadership election on February 28, 2015. From 2006 to 2014, Lantz was a member of the Charlottetown City Council. Lantz led the party in the 2015 provincial election, but fell 24 votes short in his attempt to win his own seat representing the riding of Charlottetown-Brighton in the provincial legislature. The margin was reduced to 22 votes after a recount. Lantz resigned as PC leader on September 23, 2015.

He is the brother of Jeff Lantz, a former Prince Edward Island MLA and current provincial court judge.

References

Charlottetown city councillors
Living people
Progressive Conservative Party of Prince Edward Island leaders
21st-century Canadian politicians
Year of birth missing (living people)